Ben Kirtland is a former coach for the Connecticut Huskies men's ice hockey team and former associate athletic director at the University of Kansas.

Professional career
Kirtland coached seven seasons at the Division III level from 1981 to 1988.  He led the team to one winning season during his tenure, leaving with an overall career coaching record of 85 wins, 98 losses, and 2 ties.

Head coaching record

Kirtland was the former associate athletic director at the University of Kansas up until mid-2011.

Controversies
Kirtland was a part of the Kansas Ticket Gang, which made money off of reselling tickets for the University of Kansas's football and basketball games. 

Kirkland pleaded guilty in February 2011 for conspiracy to defraud the United States, interstate transport of stolen property, and tax obstruction. He was sentenced to 57 months in federal prison.

References

Year of birth missing (living people)
Living people
UConn Huskies men's ice hockey coaches